The Nilamba (also called Nyilamba) are a Bantu ethnic and linguistic group based in Kishapu District of Shinyanga Region and Iramba District of Singida Region in central Tanzania.  In 1987 the Nilamba population was estimated to number 400,000, with 50,000 other speakers of the Nilamba language .

Ethnic groups in Tanzania
Indigenous peoples of East Africa